Matt Flapper (born 15 November 1978) is an Australian international lawn bowler. He competed in the men's fours at the 2014 Commonwealth Games where he won a bronze medal.

References

1978 births
Living people
Bowls players at the 2014 Commonwealth Games
Commonwealth Games bronze medallists for Australia
Australian male bowls players
Commonwealth Games medallists in lawn bowls
People from Creswick, Victoria
Sportsmen from Victoria (Australia)
20th-century Australian people
Medallists at the 2014 Commonwealth Games